Hydrodilatation or hydraulic arthrographic capsular distension or distension arthrography is a medical treatment for adhesive capsulitis of shoulder. The treatment is applied by a radiologist assisted by a radiographer. Contrast medium, a local anaesthetic and cortisone are injected into the joint. Then up to 40ml of sterile saline solution are injected, using X-ray as guidance, to stretch the joint capsule. Risk of complications is low. Whether the treatment is successful is known after a couple of weeks.

The procedure is performed under imaging guidance, using either fluoroscopy, ultrasound or Computed Tomography (CT).   Hydrodilatation is felt to provide benefit via two mechanisms: manual stretching of the capsule and thus disruption of adhesions which are characteristic of adhesive capsulitis, and; the introduction of cortisone provides a potent anti-inflammatory effect and thus prevents further adhesion recurrence.

Research in 2008 has questioned the benefit of hydrodilatation as giving no statistical benefit over injecting cortisone alone.

References

External links
 Literature review and case studies
 Radiology image sequence demonstrating CT guided shoulder hydrodilatation

Medical treatments